Gordon Sydney "Gord" Meeking (August 26, 1890 – December 21, 1965) was a Canadian professional ice hockey player for the Ottawa Senators, Toronto 228th Battalion, Victoria Aristocrats and Regina Capitals.

His brother Harry Meeking was also a hockey player.

Playing career
Born in Barrie, Ontario, Meeking played junior hockey for the local Barrie Colts from 1907 until 1910. He then moved to Toronto and played for Toronto Eaton's and Toronto R & AA in the Ontario Hockey Association seniors until 1915. In 1915–16, he became a professional player with the Ottawa Senators. He enlisted in the Canadian army for World War I.

Before going to Europe to fight, he played for the Toronto 228th, a team of enlisted professional ice hockey players. After the war, he returned, and first played for Glace Bay Miners of the Cape Breton league. He moved out west and played for the Victoria Aristocrats in 1920–21 and the Regina Capitals in 1921–22 before retiring.

See also
 National Hockey Association
 Pacific Coast Hockey Association

1890 births
1965 deaths
Canadian ice hockey players
Ice hockey people from Simcoe County
Ottawa Senators (NHA) players
Regina Capitals players
Sportspeople from Barrie
Toronto 228th Battalion players
Victoria Aristocrats players